Mount Hua is a mountain located near the city of Huayin in Shaanxi Province, about  east of Xi'an. It is the "Western Mountain" of the Five Great Mountains of China and has a long history of religious significance.

Geography
Mount Hua is situated in Huayin City, which is 120 kilometres (about 75 miles) from Xi'an. It is located near the southeast corner of the Ordos Loop section of the Yellow River basin, south of the Wei River valley, at the eastern end of the Qin Mountains, in Southern Shaanxi Province. It is part of the Qinling or Qin Mountains, which divide not only northern and southern Shaanxi, but also China.

Summits
Traditionally, only the giant plateau with its summits to the south of the peak Wuyun Feng (Five Cloud Summit) was called Taihua Shan (Great Flower Mountain). It could only be accessed through the ridge known as Canglong Ling (Dark Dragon Ridge) until a second trail was built in the 1980s to go around Canglong Ling. Three peaks were identified with respective summits: the East, South and West peaks.  
 
The East peak consists of four summits. The highest summit is Zhaoyang Feng (Facing Yang Summit, i.e. the summit facing the sun). Its elevation is reported to be  and its name is often used as the name for the whole East Peak. To the east of Zhaoyang Feng is Shilou Feng (Stone Tower Summit), to the south is Botai Feng (Broad Terrace Summit) and to the west is Yunü Feng (}, Jade Maiden Summit). Today, Yunü Feng considered its own peak, most central on the mountain.

The South peak consists of three summits. To the east is Songgui Feng (Pines and Junipers Summit) and to the west is Xiaozi Feng (Filial Son Summit).

The West peak has only one summit and it is known as Lianhua Feng or Furong Feng, both meaning Lotus Flower Summit.

With the development of new trail to Hua Shan in the 3rd through 5th century along the Hua Shan Gorge. The peak immediately to the north of Canglong Ling, Yuntai Feng (Cloud Terrace Peak), was identified as the North peak.

Climate
Mount Hua has a humid continental climate (Köppen climate classification Dwb).

History
As early as the 2nd century BC, there was a Daoist temple known as the Shrine of the Western Peak located at its base. Daoists believed that in the mountain lives the god of the underworld. The temple at the foot of the mountain was often used for spirit mediums to contact the god and his underlings. Unlike Taishan, which became a popular place of pilgrimage, Huashan, because of the inaccessibility of its summits, only received Imperial and local pilgrims, and was not well visited by pilgrims from the rest of China. Huashan was also an important place for immortality seekers, as many herbal Chinese medicines are grown and powerful drugs were reputed to be found there. Kou Qianzhi (365–448), the founder of the Northern Celestial Masters received revelations there, as did Chen Tuan (920–989), who spent the last part of his life in hermitage on the west peak. In the 1230s, all the temples on the mountain came under control of the Daoist Quanzhen School. In 1998, the management committee of Huashan agreed to turn over most of the mountain's temples to the China Daoist Association. This was done to help protect the environment, as the presence of taoists and nuns deters poachers and loggers.

Temples
Huashan has a variety of temples and other religious structures on its slopes and peaks. At the foot of the mountains is the Cloister of the Jade Spring, which is dedicated to Chen Tuan. Additionally, atop the southernmost peak, there is an ancient Taoist temple which in modern times has been converted into a tea house.

Ascent routes

There are three routes leading to Huashan's North Peak, the lowest of the mountain's five major peaks. The most popular is the traditional route in Hua Shan Yu (Hua Shan Gorge), first developed in the 3rd to 4th century A.D. and with successive expansion, mostly during the Tang Dynasty. It winds for 6 km from Huashan village to the north peak. A new route in Huang Pu Yu (Huang Pu Gorge, named after the hermit Huang Lu Zi who lived in this gorge in 8th century BC) follows the cable car to the North Peak, and is actually the ancient trail used prior to the Tang Dynasty, which has since fallen into disrepair. It had only been known to local villagers living nearby at the gorges since 1949, when a group of seven People's Liberation Army soldiers with a local guide used this route to climb to the North Peak and captured over 100 Kuomintang soldiers stationed on the North Peak and along the path of the traditional route. This trail is now known as "The Intelligent Take-over Route of Hua Shan", and was reinforced in early 2000. The Cable Car System stations are built next to the beginning and ends of this trail. A second cable car line, to the West Peak, was opened in 2013.

This was the only trail to go to the four other peaks—the West Peak, the Center Peak, the East Peak and the South Peak (2154.9m),—until a new path was built to the east around the ridge in 1998.

Huashan has historically been a place of retreat for hardy hermits, whether Daoist, Buddhist or other; access to the mountain was only deliberately available to the strong-willed, or those who had found "the way". With greater mobility and prosperity, Chinese, particularly students, began to test their mettle and visit in the 1980s.

Hiking danger
The route up the mountain has been called one of the most dangerous hikes in the world.
As tourism has boomed and the mountain's accessibility vastly improved with the installation of the cable car in the 1990s, visitor numbers have surged. The many exposed, narrow pathways with precipitous drops gave the mountain a deserved reputation for danger, although safety measures — such as cutting deeper pathways, building up stone steps and wider paths, and adding railings — have to some extent mitigated the danger. The local government has opened new tracks and created one-way routes on some of the more dangerous parts so that, barring crowds and icy conditions, the mountain can be scaled without extreme risk now. Some of the most precipitous tracks have been closed off. The former trail leading along a cliff face from the North Peak to the South Peak was known as being extremely dangerous; there is now a new and safer stone-built path to the South Peak temple and on to the Peak itself.

Many Chinese still climb at nighttime, in order to reach the East Peak by dawn—though the mountain now has many hotels. This practice is a holdover from when it was considered safer to simply be unable to see the extreme danger of the tracks during the ascent, as well as to avoid meeting descending visitors at points where pathways have scarcely enough room for one visitor to pass through safely.

See also

 Cui Hao
 Huaxia
 Caminito del Rey
 Mount Hua Sect

References

Citations

Sources 
 Goossaert, Vincent. "Huashan." in Fabrizio Pregadio, ed., The Encyclopedia of Taoism (London: Routledge, 2008), 481–482. TO FIX
 Harper, Damian. China. London: Lonely Planet, 2007.
 Palmer, Martin (October 26, 2006). "Religion and the Environment in China". Chinadialogue. Retrieved on 2008-08-27.

External links

 HuaShan Plank Path Walk
 Travel writer Robin Esrock visits Mount Hua

Hua
Hua
Hua
Taoism in China
Tourist attractions in Shaanxi